The Constitution Alteration (Marketing) Bill 1936, was an unsuccessful proposal to alter the Australian Constitution to ensure that the Commonwealth could continue legislative schemes for the marketing of agricultural produce such as the quota for dried fruits. It was put to voters for approval in a referendum held on 6 March 1937.

Question
Do you approve of the proposed law for the alteration of the Constitution entitled 'Constitution Alteration (Marketing) 1936'?

The proposal was to insert section 92a into the constitution as follows:

92a. The provisions of the last preceding section [ie section 92] shall not apply to laws with respect to marketing made by, or under the authority of, the Parliament in the exercise of any powers vested in the Parliament by this Constitution.

Background

This judgment overturned a previous High Court decision in W & A McArthur Ltd v Queensland that section 92 of the constitution applied to state legislation but not to legislation passed by the Australian parliament.

A 22 page booklet was prepared setting out the arguments in favour of the proposal and those against that were endorsed by a majority of members of parliament who voted for and against the proposal.

Yes case
The argument in favor of the amendments was prepared by the Attorney-General Robert Menzies. The Sun summarised the yes case as follows:There can be no effective control of marketing of products in Australia, unless there can be control of interstate transactions in these products.

By 1928 it had been realised, as a result of legal decision, that no State Parliament was in a position to exercise effective control over Interstate trade. The Commonwealth Parliament was not bound by Section 92 of the Constitution, and the States concerned eagerly asked the Commonwealth to pass a law relating to interstate trade in dried fruits, which would be supplementary to and give effect to States' schemes of control, already in operation. The Commonwealth agreed, and the result was the Dried Fruits Act.

The Privy Council decided the Commonwealth had no power to pass an interstate trade or commerce law which interfered with the absolute freedom of that trade or commerce. The Commonwealth law became unconstitutional and the State laws were reduced to equal futility. The marketing of other primary products was affected.

The amendment is one to permit co-operation between the Commonwealth and the States in the marketing field, which is at present constitutionally impossible. There is no invasion of State rights. The
States cannot legislate for the Australian marketing of goods without the Commonwealth help, and that help cannot be given unless the amendment is carried.

No case
The Sun summarised the no case as follows:A "Yes" majority will give a few people power to tax many without their consent.

Monopolies will coerce small farmers, farm employees will get nothing, and wage-earners' wages will shrink as prices are artificially forced up.

When the Commonwealth legislated for dried fruits it did not protect the consumer, the farm employee, or the minority growers, but merely fastened together a collection of State laws.

In August, 1930, Mr. Menzies said it was ludicrous to suggest that prices of important commodities could be put up without reducing what the ordinary consumer would be able to buy week for week with his wages or salary.

We support full Commonwealth powers over marketing. We normally consume most of our own food. Reject this proposal and the way is cleared for a national and equitable solution of our marketing problems.

Under the cloak of technical and  language upon the pretext of an emergency, the Government is making another attempt to whittle away self-government.

Results

Discussion
This was the first of 11 referendums that failed to achieve a majority in any state.

See also
Politics of Australia
History of Australia

Notes

References

Further reading
 Standing Committee on Legislative and Constitutional Affairs (1997) Constitutional Change: Select sources on Constitutional change in Australia 1901–1997. Australian Government Printing Service, Canberra.
 Bennett, Scott (2003). Research Paper no. 11 2002–03: The Politics of Constitutional Amendment Australian Department of the Parliamentary Library, Canberra.
 Australian Electoral Commission (2007) Referendum Dates and Results 1906 – Present AEC, Canberra.

Referendum (Marketing)
1937 referendums
1937 (Marketing)